Namgajwa-dong is a dong, neighbourhood of Seodaemun-gu in Seoul, South Korea.

See also 
Administrative divisions of South Korea

References

External links
 Seodaemun-gu Official site in English
 Map of Seodaemun-gu
 Seodaemun-gu Official website
 Namgajwa 1-dong Resident office 

Neighbourhoods of Seodaemun District